is a song by Japanese singer LiSA. It is the singer's seventeenth single and includes three other tracks. The song was released on October 14, 2020, by Sacra Music and Sony Music Japan. It serves as the theme song for the film Demon Slayer: Kimetsu no Yaiba the Movie: Mugen Train (2020). "Homura" won the grand prize at the 62nd Japan Record Awards in 2020.

Background and release
LiSA released "Gurenge" in July 2019, which served as the opening theme of the anime series Demon Slayer: Kimetsu no Yaiba. "Gurenge" was commercially successful, reaching number two on the Japan Hot 100 chart and was certified Million by the Recording Industry Association of Japan. On August 2, 2020, "Homura" was announced as the opening theme song of the film version of the anime series Demon Slayer: Kimetsu no Yaiba the Movie: Mugen Train, that was slated to be released on October 16, 2020. The single was released in digital and CD formats on October 14, 2020, by Sacra Music and Sony Music Japan, in conjunction with LiSA's studio album Leo Nine. The physical version was made available in three different editions: Regular Edition, Limited Edition and First Press Limited Edition. All three versions contain "Homura" as A-side and "Lost romance" as B-side. Both the regular and first press limited editions include "Leopardess" as B-side whereas and "My Friends Forever" comes as a B-side exclusively on the limited edition.

Composition
LiSA wrote "Homura" with its composer Yuki Kajiura, with the latter also handling production. Musically, it is a ballad number. Speaking about the song, LiSA stated, "I've been involved in numerous anime works, and 'Homura' was another song that I wrote by putting a lot of thought into the work it would accompany, just like every other track that I’ve released." Within the context of the film, the song is used as the character Kyojuro Rengoku's requiem, with the lyrics appearing to be from the perspective of his apparition.

Music video
The music video for the song, directed by Masakazu Fukatsu, was uploaded to LiSA's YouTube channel on October 14, 2020. It was preceded by a trailer released to the same platform on October 2. The video features LiSA singing "Homura" on a solitary sea beach, against the backdrop of changing colours of the sky at the break of dawn.

Commercial performance

"Homura" was debuted at number one on the Oricon Singles Chart on the chart issue dated October 20, 2020, selling 68,000 copies in its first week. Additionally, LiSA topped the Oricon Albums Chart with Leo-Nine simultaneously. By doing so, LiSA became the first female artist in 16 years and 6 months to do so since Hikaru Utada. The single simultaneously topped Oricon's Weekly Digital Single and Combined Streaming charts, recording over 141,000 download sales and 8.67 million streams in its opening week. In its second week, the song maintained its number one spot, selling another 42,000 copies. In doing so, LiSA became the first female artist to earn the number one spot for two consecutive weeks since Kana Uemura's "Toilet no Kamisama" (2011). It sold 133,087 downloads on the digital singles chart and recorded over 16.74 million streams, breaking the record of highest streams which was previously held by NiziU's "Make You Happy" (2020). On the week of November 3, 2020, "Homura" remained at number one with 32,000 copies sold, thus tallying a total of three consecutive weeks atop the Oricon chart. It became the first song to do so in 12 years and 10 months since SMAP's "Dangan Faitā" (2007). On the week of December 23, 2020, the single remained at the top spot on the digital singles chart, spending a total of 10 consecutive weeks and tied the record of most weeks at number one with Kenshi Yonezu's "Lemon" (2018). The following week, it maintained its position, tallying a total of 11 consecutive weeks at number one and becoming the longest-running chart-topper on the chart.

"Homura" arrived at number one on the Japan Hot 100 chart, with  65,000 copies in its first tracking week. With Leo-Nine simultaneously topping the Hot Albums chart, LiSA became the first act in history to have both a song and an album debut at number one on the chart. The song held its position in its second week, with 28,832 units sold and 18.8 million streams. With "Gurenge" climbing back to number two, LiSA simultaneously claimed the top two spots on the chart. On Billboard Japans Streaming chart dated December 7, 2020, the single amassed cumulative streams of over 100 million, becoming the fastest song to do so in seven weeks and surpassed the record of BTS' "Dynamite" (2020). For the year-end chart, it was the ninth best-performing single of 2020 on the Japan Hot 100. "Homura" was certified platinum by the RIAJ for exceeding 250,000 physical units and million for exceeding 1 million digital sales.

On the week of October 24, 2020, "Homura" debuted at number 62 on the Billboard Global 200 and at number 21 on the Billboard Global Excl. US charts. In its second week, the song reached a peak of number eight on the Billboard Global 200, with 19.4 million streams and 97,000 download sales globally. It simultaneously climbed to number two on the Billboard Global Excl. US chart.

Track listing

Charts

Weekly charts

Year-end charts

Certifications

References

2020 singles
LiSA (Japanese musician, born 1987) songs
Songs written by LiSA (Japanese musician, born 1987)
Songs written by Yuki Kajiura
Japanese-language songs
Demon Slayer: Kimetsu no Yaiba
Oricon Weekly number-one singles
Billboard Japan Hot 100 number-one singles
Songs about death
Songs written for animated films